Michael Edward Boyle (born 1965) is a United States Navy vice admiral who serves as commander of the United States Third Fleet since June 16, 2022. He most recently served as the Director of Maritime Operations of the United States Pacific Fleet from June 2020 to June 2022, and previously commanded Carrier Strike Group 12 from June 2019 to May 2020.

Raised in McLean, Virginia, Boyle is a 1987 graduate of Jacksonville University with a B.S. degree in business management. He is the son of a naval aviator and became one himself in January 1990 after completing flight school. Boyle later earned a master's degree in foreign affairs from the Air Command and Staff College.

References

External links
 

1965 births
Living people
Place of birth missing (living people)
People from McLean, Virginia
Jacksonville University alumni
United States Naval Aviators
Air Command and Staff College alumni
Recipients of the Meritorious Service Medal (United States)
Recipients of the Legion of Merit
United States Navy admirals